Kari Sørheim (born 12 October 1948) is a Norwegian politician for the Christian Democratic Party.

She served as a deputy representative to the Norwegian Parliament from Hordaland during the terms 1997–2001 and 2001–2005.

On the local level she has been a member of Masfjorden municipal council.

References

1948 births
Living people
Christian Democratic Party (Norway) politicians
Deputy members of the Storting
Hordaland politicians
Women members of the Storting
Place of birth missing (living people)